Hasso von Wedel may refer to:

 Hasso von Wedel (general) (1898–1961), commander of the Wehrmacht Propaganda Troops during World War II
 Hasso von Wedel (aviator) (1893–1945), German World War I flying ace and World War II pilot